The October Cup or October League is a one-time football tournament in Egypt that was held in 1974 instead of the canceled General League Championship as a result of the October War and also because of Egypt hosting the African Nations Cup 1974. The only record-breaking champion.

Conditions for organizing the tournament
After the outbreak of the October War on the sixth of October 1973, the Egyptian Premier League championship stopped 1973-74 after playing 5 rounds, and in the first half of 1974 an alternative Egyptian football tournament was organized for the Egyptian General League under the name of the October Cup. Each group played from one role, provided that the first and second ranks of each group qualify for a quad to determine the champion, which included the clubs of Zamalek SC, Al-Ittihad of Alexandria and Arsenal, it was decided that the Ghazl Al-Mahalla Club would be the fourth team, but he apologized for his engagement in the African Champions League clubs League, Zamalek SC won the championship under the leadership of player Hassan Shehata after the team ranked first in the final round to determine the champion.

References

External links

Zamalek SC on FIFA.com
Zamalek SC on CAF
Zamalek SC on Egyptian Football Association

Defunct football competitions in Egypt
October 1974 sports events in Africa
Zamalek SC